Giacomo Lauro (1550–1605), also called Giacomo da Treviso, was an Italian painter, of the late Renaissance, active mainly in his native Venice and Treviso. He was a follower of Paolo Veronese. He painted a St. Roch interceding for victims of the plague. He died in Treviso.

References

1550 births
1605 deaths
16th-century Italian painters
Italian male painters
17th-century Italian painters
Painters from Venice
Italian Renaissance painters